Avdyunin (masculine) or Avdyunina (feminine) is a Russian last name, a variant of Avdonin. The following people bear this last name:
T. Avdyunina, Soviet badminton player, winner in the women's doubles at the 1964 USSR National Badminton Championship

References

Notes

Sources
Ю. А. Федосюк (Yu. A. Fedosyuk). "Русские фамилии: популярный этимологический словарь" (Russian Last Names: a Popular Etymological Dictionary). Москва, 2006. 



Russian-language surnames